Darlove is an unincorporated community located in Washington County, Mississippi, Darlove is approximately  southwest of Kinlock and approximately  north-northeast of Hollandale.

Darlove is located on the west boundary of the Holt Collier National Wildlife Refuge, and the Bogue Phalia, a tributary of the Sunflower River, flows next to the community.

References

Unincorporated communities in Washington County, Mississippi
Unincorporated communities in Mississippi